William Keith Watkins (born July 5, 1951) is a senior United States district judge of the United States District Court for the Middle District of Alabama.

Education and career
Born in Pike County, Alabama, Watkins received a Bachelor of Science degree from Auburn University in 1973 and a Juris Doctor from the University of Alabama School of Law in 1976. He was in private practice in Alabama from 1976 to 2005.

Federal judicial service
On September 28, 2005, Watkins was nominated by President George W. Bush to a seat on the United States District Court for the Middle District of Alabama vacated by Harold Albritton. Watkins was confirmed by the United States Senate on December 21, 2005, and received his commission on December 27, 2005. He served as Chief Judge from 2011–2019. He assumed senior status on January 31, 2019.

Notable ruling
In April 2017, Watkins issued an order enabling white supremacist Richard B. Spencer to speak at Auburn University despite an initial cancelation by the administrators.  In July 2017, Watkins found that Alabama did not need to notify formerly disenfranchised ex-felons of new legislation allowing them to vote.

References

Sources

1951 births
Living people
Auburn University alumni
Judges of the United States District Court for the Middle District of Alabama
People from Pike County, Alabama
United States district court judges appointed by George W. Bush
University of Alabama School of Law alumni
21st-century American judges